The 1957 Masters Tournament was the 21st Masters Tournament, held April 4–7 at Augusta National Golf Club in Augusta, Georgia. This was the first Masters played with a 36-hole cut; 101 players started and forty made the cut at 150 (+6).

Doug Ford won his only Masters, three strokes ahead of runner-up Sam Snead, a three-time champion. Snead was the third round leader, but could only shoot even-par in a round that included six birdies and six bogeys. Ford was three strokes back after 54 holes, but was bogey-free on Sunday. On the final hole, Ford holed out from the bunker for birdie for his 66 (–6). This was Ford's second and final major title; he also won the 1955 PGA Championship.

This year was the Masters debut of Gary Player, age 21, and he tied for 24th. He won three Masters, in 1961, 1974, and 1978. Five-time British Open winner Peter Thomson was fifth, his best career finish in the Masters.  Amateur Harvie Ward was fourth at even-par 288, five strokes behind Ford.

Two-time champion Ben Hogan had finished in the top ten in the last fourteen Masters that he had entered, but had 32 putts on Friday and missed the event's first-ever cut by a stroke. It was the only cut he missed at Augusta; in nine more Masters he had three top ten finishes, including his final appearance at age 54 in 1967.

Field
This was the last year when professionals were invited based solely on qualification in amateur events.

1. Masters champions
Jack Burke Jr. (4,8,10,11), Jimmy Demaret, Claude Harmon (10), Ben Hogan (2,3,4,8,9), Herman Keiser, Cary Middlecoff (2,8,9,11), Byron Nelson (2,4), Henry Picard (4), Gene Sarazen (2,3,4), Horton Smith, Sam Snead (3,4,8,9,10,11), Craig Wood
Ralph Guldahl (2) did not play.

The following categories only apply to Americans

2. U.S. Open champions
Julius Boros (8,9), Billy Burke, Jack Fleck, Ed Furgol (8,9,10), Lawson Little (5), Tony Manero, Lloyd Mangrum (8), Fred McLeod, Sam Parks Jr., Lew Worsham

3. The Open champions
Jock Hutchison (4), Denny Shute (4)

4. PGA champions
Walter Burkemo (8), Doug Ford (8,9,11), Vic Ghezzi, Bob Hamilton, Chick Harbert (11), Chandler Harper (11), Johnny Revolta, Paul Runyan, Jim Turnesa (8)

5. U.S. Amateur and Amateur champions
Dick Chapman (a), Charles Coe (a), Joe Conrad (6), Gene Littler (8), Billy Maxwell (9), Arnold Palmer (8,9), Skee Riegel, Frank Stranahan (8), Sam Urzetta (8), Bud Ward, Harvie Ward (6,7,a)

6. Members of the 1955 U.S. Walker Cup team
William C. Campbell (a), Don Cherry (a), Bruce Cudd (a), Jimmy Jackson (a), Ed Meister (a), Dale Morey (a), Billy Joe Patton (8,9,a), Hillman Robbins (8,a), Dick Yost (a)

Robbins and Meister were reserves for the team.

7. 1956 U.S. Amateur quarter-finalists
Rex Baxter (a), Arnold Blum (a), Joe Campbell (a), Sarg Fontanini (a), Ted Gleichmann (a), Chuck Kocsis (a)

8. Top 24 players and ties from the 1956 Masters Tournament
Jerry Barber (9,11), Tommy Bolt (9,11), Pete Cooper (9), Dow Finsterwald, Shelley Mayfield, Al Mengert, Johnny Palmer, Bob Rosburg, Mike Souchak, Ken Venturi (9)

9. Top 24 players and ties from the 1956 U.S. Open
Errie Ball, Johnny Bulla, Billy Casper, Wes Ellis, Fred Haas, Dutch Harrison, Jay Hebert, Bob Kay, Ted Kroll (10,11), Bill Ogden, Bob Toski

10. 1956 PGA Championship quarter-finalists
Fred Hawkins, Bill Johnston, Terl Johnson, Henry Ransom

11. Members of the U.S. 1955 Ryder Cup team
Marty Furgol

12. One player, either amateur or professional, not already qualified, selected by a ballot of ex-Masters champions
Mike Fetchick

13. One professional, not already qualified, selected by a ballot of ex-U.S. Open champions
Dick Mayer

14. One amateur, not already qualified, selected by a ballot of ex-U.S. Amateur champions
Bud Taylor (a)

15. Two players, not already qualified, from a points list based on finishes in the winter part of the 1957 PGA Tour
Gardner Dickinson, Art Wall Jr.

16.  Winner of the 1956 Canadian Open
Doug Sanders

17. Foreign invitations
Al Balding, Henry Cotton (9), Bruce Crampton, Stan Leonard (8), Jerry Magee (7,a), Moe Norman, Gary Player, Peter Thomson (8), Harry Weetman, Trevor Wilkes

Numbers in brackets indicate categories that the player would have qualified under had they been American.

Round summaries

First round 
Thursday, April 4, 1957

Source:

Second round 
Friday, April 5, 1957

Source:

Third round 
Saturday, April 6, 1957

Source:

Final round 
Sunday, April 7, 1957

Final leaderboard

Sources:

Scorecard 

Cumulative tournament scores, relative to par
{|class="wikitable" span = 50 style="font-size:85%;
|-
|style="background: Pink;" width=10|
|Birdie
|style="background: PaleGreen;" width=10|
|Bogey
|style="background: Green;" width=10|
|Double bogey
|style="background: Olive;" width=10|
|Triple bogey+ 
|}
Source:

References

External links 
Masters.com – past winners and results
Augusta.com – 1957 Masters leaderboard and scorecards

1957
1957 in golf
1957 in American sports
1957 in sports in Georgia (U.S. state)
April 1957 sports events in the United States